The Artery Foundation is a full-service management company based in California and founded in 2004. The Artery Foundation finds, represents, supports and manages various entertainment artists.

The Artery Foundation hosts its own North American tour Artery Foundation Across the Nation Tour, which started in 2008 and has since then expanded to Europe. The tour is often held in the springtime. The company also hosts an annual free showcase at the South by Southwest music festival where fans line up as early as 4:00 am to guarantee a spot into the show.

During the summer of 2012, The Artery Foundation opened up an additional office in Australia. Arrangements are currently underway for an additional office in Portland.

Artery Recordings
In 2010 Eric Rushing started Artery Recordings, an imprint record label with Razor & Tie.

Current artists as of 2016

 Alesana
 American Standards
 Anvil
 Arsis
 Captain Midnite
 Conquer Divide
 Davey Suicide
 Dayshell
 Deathstars
 Destruction
 Devil in the Details
 Flotsam and Jetsam
 Graveshadow

 Hail the Sun
 Jesse Lawson
 Kyle Lucas
 Miss Fortune
 Necromancing the Stone
 Northern Lights
 Psychostick
 Sleeptalk
 Straight Line Stitch
 The Color Wild
 Unleash the Archers
 William Control

Alumni

 3 Inches of Blood
 Abandon All Ships
 A Bullet for Pretty Boy
 Adestria
 A Day To Remember
 Affiance
 A Lot Like Birds
 A Static Lullaby
 The Agonist
 The Air I Breathe
 Alive, in Standby
 All Shall Perish
 Amarna Reign
 Amyst
 The Amity Affliction
 An Angle
 An Early Ending
 Arden Park Roots
 Armor For The Broken
 The Arrival
 Artifex Pereo
 Asking Alexandria
 A Skylit Drive
 Attack Attack!
 Attila
 At the Skylines
 Beartooth
 Before Their Eyes
 Being as an Ocean
 Betraying the Martyrs
 Black Tongue
 Bleach Blonde
 Blessed by a Broken Heart
 Blinded Black
 Blood Youth
 Boris the Blade
 Breathe Carolina
 Broadway
 Brokencyde
 The Browning
 Bruised But Not Broken
 Built On Secrets
 Burden of a Day
 Buried In Verona
 Burn Halo
 Bury Tomorrow
 Capture the Crown
 Carcer City
 Chelsea Grin
 Chunk! No, Captain Chunk!
 Church Tongue
 City Lights
 CLASS
 Close to Home
 Come Wind
 Conducting from the Grave
 Corrosion of Conformity
 The Crimson Armada
 Currents
 Dance Gavin Dance
 Dark Sermon
 Dayseeker
 Deadhand
 Dead Silence Hides My Cries
 Death Of An Era
 Demon Hunter
 Desolated
 The Devil Wears Prada
 The Divine
 Dream On, Dreamer
 Dredg
 Drop Dead, Gorgeous
 Early Seasons
 Earth Crisis
 Emarosa
 Embracer
 ERRA
 Eva Plays Dead
 Evergreen Terrace
 Ex Deo
 Exotype
 Fight Fair
 First Blood
 Fit for a King
 For All Eternity
 For All Those Sleeping
 For the Fallen Dreams
 Four Letter Lie
 From First to Last
 Get Scared
 Ghost Key
 The Gift of Ghosts
 Glamour of the Kill
 Handguns
 Heart Of A Coward
 Hearts&Hands
 Honor Bright
 Honour Crest
 The Hottness
 Hundredth
 I Am Abomination 
 Idlehands
 I Declare War
 Incredible' Me

 Impending Doom
 I See Stars
 I Set My Friends On Fire
 In Alcatraz 1962
 In Dying Arms
 In Fear and Faith
 Jonny Craig
 Kataklysm
 Katastro
 Kublai Khan
 Kurt Travis
 Lead Hands
 Like Moths to Flames
 Living Sacrifice
 Lower Definition
 Make Them Suffer
 Malevolence
 May 4 Massacre
 Mantis
 Memphis May Fire
 Merchants
 Mercy Music
 Millionaires
 Miracle at St. Anna
 The Mission in Motion
 Miss May I
 Molotov Solution
 Motionless In White
 MSWHITE
 MyChildren MyBride
 My Enemies & I
 My Iron Lung
 Myka, Relocate
 Native Suns
 Nerd Rage
 Novelists
 Oceans Ate Alaska
 Oceana
 Oceano
 The Ocean
 Of Machines
 Of Mice & Men
 Oh, Sleeper
 Old Again
 The Ongoing Concept
 The Orphan, The Poet
 Our Hollow, Our Home
 Our Last Night
 Outline in Color
 Out of Hand
 Panzer
 Phinehas
 The Plot In You
 Polyphia
 Prepared Like A Bride
 Revocation
 Saving Grace
 Saviour
 Scarlett O' Hara
 The Seeking
 Set to Reflect
 Serpents
 Sheilds
 Shoot the Girl First
 Sierra
 Silent Planet
 Silent Screams
 Silence the Messenger
 Sinizen
 Sirens and Sailors
 Sister Sin
 Slaves
 Sluggo
 Sleeping Giant
 Sleeping with Sirens
 Stick to Your Guns
 The Storm Picturesque
 Storm The Sky
 Sylar
 System Divide
 Tear Out the Heart
 Ten After Two
 This or the Apocalypse
 This Wild Life
 Throwdown
 Tides of Man
 Tilian Pearson
 To Each His Own
 Unearth
 Upon This Dawning
 Vanna
 Varsity (now on Nightfall Management)
 Veara
 War From A Harlots Mouth
 War of Ages
 We Rob Banks
 With One Last Breath
 Whitechapel
 White Fox Society
 Within the Ruins
 Woe, Is Me
 Wolves at the Gate

Songwriters
 Alex Wade
 Ben Bruce
 Ben Savage
 Caleb Shomo
 David Davidson
 Felix Andreani
 Matsvei Fedorentchik
 Ramin Niroomand

Music producers
 Andreas Magnusson
 Kris Crummett
 Nick Sampson
 Zeuss

Photo & Video
 Ambitious.Films
 Phill Mamula

References

External links

Entertainment companies of the United States
Companies based in California